Martin Lynn (31 August 1951 – 15 April 2005) was a British and Nigerian historian and academic, specialising in African History. Having taught at the University of Ilorin, he was Professor of African History at Queen's University Belfast. He was the first person to hold a professorship in African history in Ireland.

Lynn, a native of Nigeria, he studied at School of Oriental and African Studies, University of London (MA) and at King's College London (PhD). He was an active member of the Society of Friends. The Martin Lynn Scholarship in African History, administered by the Royal Historical Society, was founded in his memory.

Selected works
His publications include:
 Commerce and Economic Change in West Africa: The Palm Oil Trade in the Nineteenth Century  (Cambridge University Press, 1997)
 Nigeria 1943-60 in the British Documents at the End of the Empire project (HMSO, London, 2001)
 
 Encountering the Light: A Journey Taken (Ebor Press, York)

References

 http://www.postgraduatestudentships.co.uk/node/775
 https://web.archive.org/web/20030804013059/http://www.sessionsofyork.co.uk/books/intro.html

20th-century Nigerian historians
Academics of Queen's University Belfast
1951 births
2005 deaths
Nigerian Quakers